The 1942 Pennsylvania gubernatorial election occurred on November 3, 1942. Incumbent Republican governor Arthur James was not a candidate for re-election. Republican candidate Edward Martin defeated Democratic candidate F. Clair Ross to become Governor of Pennsylvania.

Results

|-
|-bgcolor="#EEEEEE"
| colspan="3" align="right" | Totals
| align="right" | 2,548,071
| align="right" | 100.00%
|}

References

1942
Pennsylvania
Gubernatorial
November 1942 events